The last event of the women's alpine skiing, the giant slalom, took place on Friday, 24 February. Kostelić was a favourite once again, as she was defending Olympic champion, but Swede Anja Pärson led the World Cup and was defending World Champion of the event. Kostelić was second in the World Cup standing, however, while Austrian Kathrin Zettel was third.

Results
Complete results from the Women's Giant Slalom event at the 2006 Winter Olympics.

References

External links
Official Olympic Report

Giant slalom